Daniel A. Reed (July 12, 1892 – February 9, 1978) was an American actor, playwright, and screenwriter.

Biography
Reed was born July 12, 1892, in Denver, Colorado.  He took to theatre in 1912.  He developed his own one-man show based on Edgar Lee Masters Spoon River Anthology.  In Chicago he married Isadora Bennett in 1918.  Together they founded Town Theatre in Columbia, South Carolina.

In 1930, he was a MacDowell colonist.  He spent a few years in Hollywood as a dialect coach, eventually settling in New York in 1936 as an actor.

He was awarded the Outer Critics Circle Award in 1950 for his role as the Postman in Come Back, Little Sheba.

He died February 9, 1978, in Montrose, New York.

Plays

 Black April, an adaptation of the novel by Julia Peterkin
 Scarlet Sister Mary (1929), an adaptation of the Pulitzer Prize winning novel by Julia Peterkin
 Goodbye in the Morning (1930)

Filmography

Film credits

Maybe It's Love (1935) (dialogue director)
Madame DuBarry (1934) (dialogue director) (uncredited)
The Dragon Murder Case (1934) (dialogue director)
Fog Over Frisco (1934) (screenwriter, dialogue director)
Young Man of Manhattan (1930) (screenwriter, dialogue director)
Jimmy the Gent (1934) (dialogue director)
Queen High (1930) (dialogue director)
The Sap from Syracuse (1930) (dialogue director)

Television appearances

Kiss Her Goodbye (1959) (actor)
Goodyear Television Playhouse (1 episode, 1951) (actor)
Armstrong Circle Theatre (1 episode, 1950) (actor)
The Chevrolet Tele-Theatre (2 episodes, 1950) (actor)

References

External links

 

Male actors from Colorado
American male film actors
American film directors
American male screenwriters
1892 births
1978 deaths
20th-century American male actors
20th-century American male writers
20th-century American screenwriters